Poltergay is a 2006 French film directed by Éric Lavaine and based on an idea by Héctor Cabello Reyes. The script was written by Héctor Cabello Reyes and Éric Lavaine. The film was released on 25 October 2006.

Plot
Emma and Marc, two young lovers, move into a house which has been uninhabited for thirty years. They do not know is that in 1979, in a cave under the house, there was a gay disco, which burned down when a foam machine short-circuited, and five bodies were never found. Today, the house is haunted by five gay ghosts. However, only Marc is able to see them, and his visions drive Emma away. The ghosts, touched by Marc's problems, do everything in their power to help him get his girl back.

Cast
Clovis Cornillac as Marc 
Julie Depardieu as Emma 
Lionel Abelanski as Salopette 
Michel Duchaussoy as De Sorgue 
Philippe Duquesne as Michel
 as David
Georges Gay as Ivan
 as Bertrand
 as Gilles
Héctor Cabello Reyes as Psychiatrist

Reception
On review aggregator Rotten Tomatoes, the film holds an approval rating of 60% based on 5 reviews, with an average rating of 4.5/10.

References

External links

French LGBT-related films
LGBT-related comedy horror films
2006 LGBT-related films
Films directed by Éric Lavaine
2006 comedy horror films
French ghost films
2006 comedy films
Gay-related films
2000s French films